Syunik may refer to:

 Siunia dynasty, ancient Armenian noble family.
 Syunik (historic province), the 9th province of the historic Kingdom of Armenia.
 Kingdom of Syunik, medieval Armenian kingdom dependent to Bagratid Armenia, Kingdom of Georgia and Mongol Empire.
 Syunik (village), a village in Syunik Province.
 Syunik Province, an administrative entity in Armenia.